Helen Rodda Williams  (born 21 March 1945) is a retired Australian senior public servant. She was the first woman in the Australian Public Service to be appointed as a Secretary of an Australian government department.

Early life
Helen Williams was born in Adelaide, South Australia on 21 March 1945, as the eldest of five daughters of academics Sir Bruce Williams and his wife, Roma Olive Hotten (1916-1992).

Career
Early in her public service career, Williams joined the second division in the Department of Finance in 1979, her employment was controversial at the time due to her being a woman.

When she was promoted to Deputy Secretary in the Department of Education and Youth Affairs in 1983, she became the first woman to hold a deputy secretary position in the Australian Government sphere. She was Acting Secretary of the Department of Education and Youth Affairs for a short time in 1984, and was later promoted to Secretary of the Department of Education in 1985, serving in the role until 1987 Her appointment as Secretary of the education department was the first time a woman had been appointed to head an Australian Government department of state.

Williams told The Canberra Times in 2006 that in 1987 she was criticised by some women's groups and the senior public service bureaucracy when she took six months maternity leave after having her baby. Her daughter, Anna von Reibnitz, had been born in December 1986.

Williams returned to work from maternity leave in 1987 on the day that a reorganisation of the public service was complete, with 28 departments cut down to just 18. Williams was not one of the previous secretaries who was given a department and was instead appointed Associate Secretary in the Department of the Prime Minister and Cabinet. While Associate Secretary, she headed the arm of the department responsible for Commonwealth-state relations during Prime Minister Bob Hawke's push for "New Federalism", which saw the break-ups of functions between different layers of government under review.

In 1993, Williams was returned to a Secretary role, this time as head of the Department of Tourism.

1996 to 2009
Secretary of the Department of Immigration and Multicultural Affairs 1996–1998
Public Service Commissioner 1998–2002
Secretary of the Department of Communications, Information Technology and the Arts 2001–2007
Secretary of the Department of Human Services 2007–2009

Williams retired from the Australian Public Service in 2009. The APS celebrated the 30th anniversary of her appointment in November 2015.

Awards
Williams was appointed an Officer of the Order of Australia in June 1993 for service to public administration, particularly in the areas of education and social welfare. In 2001, Williams was awarded the Centenary Medal "for service as Secretary, Department of Communications, Information Technology and the Arts". On Australia Day 2019, Williams was appointed a Companion of the Order of Australia "for eminent service to public administration through senior advisory roles, and to policy reform and innovative program delivery.".

Private life
In 1979, Williams married Friedrich Baron von Reibnitz (b. 1942), a senior officer with the Australian Bureau of Statistics. He is an elder brother of Princess Michael of Kent and the only son of Günther Hubertus Freiherr von Reibnitz by his second wife, Countess Maria Anna Szapáry von Muraszombath, Széchysziget et Szapár (1911–1998).

Notes

References

1945 births
Living people
Australian public servants
Companions of the Order of Australia
National Library of Australia Council members
Officers of the Order of Australia
Recipients of the Centenary Medal
Secretaries of the Australian Government Education Department
Secretaries of the Australian Government Immigration Department